Sorbus scopulina is a species of rowan that is native to western North America, primarily in the Rocky Mountains. The common name of this species is often given as Greene's mountain-ash, and is so named in honor of American botanist Edward Lee Greene. Throughout the Cascade Mountains and the Pacific Northwest portions of this rowan's habitat, it is commonly called Cascade mountain-ash, sometimes listed as Sorbus scopulina var. cascadensis.

Various birds and mammals, including bears, eat the fruit. They were eaten by Native Americans and early settlers, and be cooked and made into jelly. They taste bitter when fresh, and are better when they redden. They should not be confused with poisonous baneberries, particularly the red baneberry.

References

External links
 Interactive Distribution Map for Sorbus scopulina

scopulina
Berries
Flora of Subarctic America
Flora of Western Canada
Flora of the Northwestern United States
Flora of the North-Central United States
Flora of the South-Central United States
Flora of the Southwestern United States
Flora without expected TNC conservation status